Bath Festival may refer to:
Bath International Music Festival
Bath Festival of Blues 1969
Bath Festival of Blues and Progressive Music
Bath Festival of Children's Literature
Bath Fringe Festival

See also
Bathing Festival (disambiguation)